Pelochrista medullana, the brown-winged root moth, is a moth of the family Tortricidae. It is native to central Europe, Turkey, southern Russia, Iran and China (Xinjiang). In North America, it has been introduced to Idaho, Montana, Oregon and British Columbia. Introduction in the United States was approved in 1984.

The wingspan is 14–21 mm. Adults are on wing from mid-June to the end of July. There is one generation per year.

Larvae feed on Centaurea maculosa, Centaurea biebersteinii and Centaurea diffusa in the rosette stage. They damage the roots of their host, reducing root storage capacity and exposing the plant to pathogens. Small plants are usually completely destroyed.

References

External links
 Biological Control

Eucosmini
Moths described in 1880
Moths of Europe
Insects of Turkey
Lepidoptera used as pest control agents